KICJ (88.9 FM) is a radio station licensed to Mitchellville, Iowa, serving the Des Moines area. The station is owned by the University of Northern Iowa. KICJ is an affiliate of Iowa Public Radio, and carries the network's classical service.

See also
Iowa Public Radio

External links
Iowa Public Radio

ICJ
University of Northern Iowa
NPR member stations
ICJ
Radio stations established in 2003